Lozna is a commune located in Sălaj County, Transylvania, Romania. It is composed of five villages: Cormeniș (Ködmönös), Lozna, Preluci (Kőlózna), Valea Leșului (Lesvölgy) and Valea Loznei (Lóznavölgy).

Sights 
 Wooden church of Lozna (built 1813)
 Wooden church of Preluci (built 1875
 Wooden church of Valea Loznei (built 1870)

References

Communes in Sălaj County
Localities in Transylvania